Derby City Council elections are generally held three years out of every four, with a third of the council elected each time. Derby City Council is the local authority for the unitary authority of Derby in Derbyshire, England. Since the last boundary changes in 2002, 51 councillors have been elected from 17 wards. From 2023 the council will move to the whole council being elected once every four years.

Political control
From 1889 to 1974 Derby was a county borough, independent of any county council. Under the Local Government Act 1972 it became a non-metropolitan district, with Derbyshire County Council providing county-level services. The first election to the reformed borough council was held in 1973, initially operating as a shadow authority before coming into its revised powers on 1 April 1974. Derby was awarded city status in 1977. Derby became a unitary authority on 1 April 1997, regaining its independence from Derbyshire County Council. Political control of the council since 1973 has been held by the following parties:

Non-metropolitan district

Unitary authority

Leadership
The leaders of the council since 2002 have been:

Council elections
1973 Derby Borough Council election
1976 Derby Borough Council election
1979 Derby City Council election (New ward boundaries)
1980 Derby City Council election
1982 Derby City Council election
1983 Derby City Council election
1984 Derby City Council election
1986 Derby City Council election
1987 Derby City Council election
1988 Derby City Council election
1990 Derby City Council election
1991 Derby City Council election
1992 Derby City Council election
1994 Derby City Council election
1995 Derby City Council election
1996 Derby City Council election
1998 Derby City Council election
1999 Derby City Council election
2000 Derby City Council election
2002 Derby City Council election (New ward boundaries increased the number of seats by seven)
2003 Derby City Council election
2004 Derby City Council election
2006 Derby City Council election
2007 Derby City Council election
2008 Derby City Council election
2010 Derby City Council election
2011 Derby City Council election
2012 Derby City Council election
2014 Derby City Council election
2015 Derby City Council election
2016 Derby City Council election
2018 Derby City Council election
2019 Derby City Council election
2021 Derby City Council election

City result maps

By-election results

1997–2001

2001–2005

2005–2009

2009–2013

2013–2017 

The by-election was called after former Conservative councillor Richard Smalley was jailed for giving a false address.

References

External links

 By-election results 
 Derby Council

 
Politics of Derby
Council elections in Derbyshire
Unitary authority elections in England